Cham (Cham: ꨌꩌ) is a Malayo-Polynesian language of the Austronesian family, spoken by the Chams of Southeast Asia. It is spoken primarily in the territory of the former Kingdom of Champa, which spanned modern​ Southern Vietnam, as well as in Cambodia by a significant population which descends from refugees that fled during the decline and fall of Champa. The Western variety is spoken by 220,000 people in Cambodia and 25,000 people in Vietnam. As for the Eastern variety, there are about 73,000 speakers in Vietnam, for a total of approximately 320,000 speakers.

Cham belongs to the Chamic languages, which are spoken in parts of mainland Southeast Asia, Indonesia's Aceh Province, and on the island of Hainan. Cham is the oldest-attested Austronesian language, with the Đông Yên Châu inscription being verifiably dated to the late 4th century AD.

Phonology
The Cham language dialects each have 21 consonants and 9 vowels.

Consonants

  in Western Cham is heard as a velar fricative . In Eastern Cham, it is heard as an alveolar flap , glide , or trill .

Vowels

Monophthongs

Diphthongs
,  (occurs only before ),  (occurs only before ), .

Grammar

Word formation
There are several prefixes and infixes which can be used for word derivation.
 prefix pa-: causative, sometimes giving more force to the word
thau (to know) → pathau (to inform)
blei (to buy) → pablei (to sell)
biér (low) → pabiér (to lower)
yao (like, as) → payao (to compare)
jâ (finished) → pajâ (well finished)
prefix mâ-: sometimes causative, often indicates a state, possession, mutuality, reciprocity
jru (poison) → mâjru (to poison)
 (teacher) → mâgru (to study)
tian (belly) → mâtian (pregnancy)
boh (egg, fruit) → mâboh (lay an egg, give fruit)
daké (horn) → mâdaké (having horns)
prefix ta- or da-: frequentative
galung (to roll) → tagalung (to roll around)
dep (to hide oneself) → dadep (to be  to hide oneself)
infix -an-: noun formation
puec (to speak) → panuec (speech)
tiw (row) → taniw (oar)
dok (to live) → danok (house, living place)
infix -mâ-: no specific meaning
payao (to compare) → pamâyao (to compare)

Reduplication is often used:
palei, pala-palei (country)
rambah, rambah-rambâp (misery)

Syntax and word order
Cham generally uses SVO word order, without any case marking to distinguish subject from object:

Dummy pronominal subjects are sometimes used, echoing the subject:

Composite verbs will behave as one inseparable verb, having the object come after it:

Sometimes, however, the verb is placed in front of the subject:

Auxiliary verbs are placed after any objects:

If a sentence contains more than one main verb, one of the two will have an adverbial meaning:

Adjectives come after the nouns they modify:

If the order is reversed, the whole will behave like a compound:

Composite sentences can be formed with the particle krung:

It is also possible to leave out this particle, without change in meaning:

Questions are formed with the sentence-final particle rẽi:

Other question words are in situ:

Nominals
Like many languages in Eastern Asia, Cham uses numeral classifiers to express amounts. The classifier will always come after the numeral, with the noun coming invariably before or after the classifier-numeral pair.

The above examples show the classifier boḥ, which literally means "egg" and is the most frequently used — particularly for round and voluminous objects. Other classifiers are ôrang (person) for people and deities, ḅêk for long objects, blaḥ (leaf) for flat objects, and many others.

The days of the month are counted with a similar system, with two classifiers: one (bangun) used to count days before the full moon, and the other one (ranaṃ) for days after the full moon.

Personal pronouns behave like ordinary nouns and do not show any case distinctions. There are different forms depending on the level of politeness. The first person singular, for example, is kău in formal or distant context, while it is dahlak (in Vietnam) or hulun (in Cambodia) in an ordinarily polite context. As is the case with many other languages of the region, kinship terms are often used as personal pronouns.

Comparative and superlative are expressed with the locative preposition di/dii:

Verbs
There are some particles that can be used to indicate tense/aspect. The future is indicated with si or thi in Vietnam, with hi or si in Cambodia. The perfect is expressed with jâ. The first one comes in front of the verb:

The second one is sentence-final:

Certain verbs can function as auxiliaries to express other tenses or aspects. The verb dok ("to stay") is used for the continuous, wâk ("to return") for the repetitive aspect, and kieng ("to want") for the future tense.

The negation is formed with oh/o at either or both sides of the verb, or with di/dii in front.

The imperative is formed with the sentence-final particle bék, and the negative imperative with the preverbal juai/juei (in Vietnam and Cambodia respectively).

Sociolinguistics

Diglossia
Brunelle observed two phenomena of language use among speakers of Eastern Cham: They are both diglossic and bilingual (in Cham and Vietnamese). Diglossia is the situation where two varieties of a language are used in a single language community, and oftentimes one is used on formal occasions (labelled H) and the other is more colloquial (labelled L).

Dialectal differences
Cham is divided into two primary dialects. 
Western Cham: It is spoken by the Chams in Cambodia as well as in the adjacent Vietnamese provinces of An Giang and Tây Ninh.
Eastern Cham: It is spoken by the coastal Cham population in the Vietnamese provinces of Bình Thuận, Ninh Thuận, and Đồng Nai. 

The two regions where Cham is spoken are separated both geographically and culturally. The more numerous Western Cham are predominantly Muslims (although some in Cambodia now practice Theravāda Buddhism), while the Eastern Cham practice both Hinduism and Islam. Ethnologue states that the Eastern and Western dialects are no longer mutually intelligible. The table below gives some examples of words where the two dialects differed as of the 19th century.

{| class="wikitable"
|-
!
! Cambodia
! southern Vietnam
|-
! colspan = "3" align="center" | vowels
|-
| child || anœk || anẽk
|-
| take || tuk || tôk
|-
| not || jvẽi || jvai
|-
! colspan = "3" align="center" | sibilants
|-
| one || sa || tha
|-
| save from drowning || srong || throng
|-
| salt || sara || shara
|-
| equal || samu || hamu
|-
! colspan = "3" align="center" | final consonants
|-
| heavy || trap || trak
|-
| in front || anap || anak
|-
! colspan = "3" align="center" | lexical differences
|-
| market || pasa || darak
|-
| hate || amoḥ || limuk
|}

Lê et al. (2014:175) lists a few Cham subgroups.
Chăm Poông: in Thạnh Hiếu village, Phan Hiệp commune, Bắc Bình District, Bình Thuận Province. The Chăm Poông practice burial instead of cremation as the surrounding Cham do.
Chăm Hroi (population 4,000): in Phước Vân District (Bình Định Province), Đồng Xuân District (Phú Yên Province), and Tây Sơn District (Bình Định Province)
Chàvà Ku, a mixed Malay-Khmer people in Châu Đốc

Writing systems
Cham script is a Brahmic script. The script has two varieties: Akhar Thrah (Eastern Cham) and Akhar Srak (Western Cham). The Western Cham language is written with the Arabic script or the aforementioned Akhar Srak.

Dictionaries
The Ming dynasty Chinese Bureau of Translators produced a Chinese-Cham dictionary.

John Crawfurd's 1822 work "Journal of an Embassy to the Courts of Siam and Cochin-China" contains a wordlist of the Cham language.

See also
Cham script
Cham people
Cham calendar
Champa kingdom

Notes

Further reading

 
 
 
 
 Blood, D. L., & Blood, D. (1977). East Cham language. Vietnam data microfiche series, no. VD 51-72. Huntington Beach, Calif: Summer Institute of Linguistics.
 Blood, D. L. (1977). A romanization of the Cham language in relation to the Cham script. Vietnam data microfiche series, no. VD51-17. Dallas: Summer Institute of Linguistics.

External links 
 Kaipuleohone has an archive including written materials of Cham

Languages attested from the 8th century
Languages of Cambodia
Languages of China
Languages of Malaysia
Languages of Thailand
Languages of Vietnam
Chamic languages
Subject–verb–object languages